Fencing at the 2004 Summer Olympics took place at the Fencing Hall at the Hellinikon Olympic Complex. Ten gold medals were awarded in individual and team events, further divided into three styles of fencing: épée, foil and sabre.

Fencing is one of the few sports that have been featured in every modern Olympic Games, and for the first time female competitors competed individually using the sabre. The Lexan window mask, showing the athletes' faces, was used for the first time at these Olympics.

Medal summary

Men's events

Women's events

Medal table
Italy finished top of the fencing medal table at the 2004 Summer Olympics.

Participating nations
A total of 223 fencers (129 men and 94 women) from 42 nations competed at the Athens Games:

References

External links
Official result book – Fencing

 
O
2004 Summer Olympics events
2004
International fencing competitions hosted by Greece